Blackrocks Brewery is a craft brewery in Marquette, Michigan. Taking the name from a local landmark, David Manson and Andy Langlois opened Blackrocks in 2010 as a nanobrewery within a Victorian-style house. , Blackrocks is the tenth-largest brewery in Michigan with sales across the state's Upper and Lower Peninsulas and into the adjoining state of Wisconsin.

History 
David Manson and Andy Langlois founded Blackrocks Brewery in Marquette, Michigan, and opened its doors on December 28, 2010. Both were former pharmaceutical salesmen who were laid off in company downsizings during the late 2000s Great Recession. In need of work, they started a nanobrewery off of what was a homebrewing hobby and retirement dream.

The brewery, which takes its name from a set of rocks in Marquette's Presque Isle Park from which people jump into Lake Superior, began life in a  former Victorian-style residential home. The first floor serving as an area for patrons and the basement hosting a small one-barrel brewing system. Manson and Langlois would sell their product until it ran out, which happened on the first day they opened and quickly became a frequent occurrence. As a result, they expanded to a three-barrel system and added a patio to expand the small customer serving area of the establishment.

In 2013, Blackrocks expanded again into a purchased  former Coca-Cola bottling plant. They installed a twenty-barrel system in the building, which allowed the brewery to expand production to 4,500 barrels per year, and begin canning its beer. After a rapid growth in demand and a 25% increase in revenue in 2017, the company constructed a  addition on the northern side of the former bottling plant in 2018, and installed solar panels on the building's roof in 2019. In May 2020, Blackrocks added two 120-barrel fermentors.

Production and distribution 

In 2015 and 2016, Blackrocks expanded its production and started selling its products across Michigan's Lower Peninsula and in the neighboring state of Wisconsin. , Blackrocks was the ninth-largest brewery in Michigan by total production, rising 17% from the COVID-affected year prior. It was the second largest brewery in the Upper Peninsula behind the Keweenaw Brewing Company. That was up from tenth a few years earlier.

Blackrocks produced about 9,000 barrels of beer in 2020. That was up from 7,500 barrels sold in 2018, 6,595 in 2017, and 5,066 in 2016.

Mug club 
Blackrocks' "mug club" gives patrons a custom large ceramic mug that are hung in the taproom and able to be used with every beer purchase, receiving a greater quantity of beer at the regular price. The initial membership was limited to 50 people at US$40 apiece, and the brewery found that it had to continually expand the program to meet demand. By 2013, the number of mugs reached 1,100. The brewery eventually ran out of space to store additional on-site mugs, and as of 2015 the club was limited to about 1,400 patrons. , chances to join are rare and require an individual to find a "golden ticket" on public land during a designated period.

Location 
The customer-facing location of the Blackrocks Brewery is, located in a former residential home at 424 North Third Street in Marquette, Michigan. Described by the Star Tribune as looking like an "out-of-place ski chalet," it contains two floors for customers and a large patio available year-round, with fire pits installed for use during the winter. The patio, which has proven to be controversial within the mostly residential neighborhood, was expanded in 2017. In winter, the establishment erects temporary igloo-shaped structures for customers to drink inside. A fence running along the edge of the taproom's property line incorporates used skis, some donated by patrons of the brewery.

In February 2020, the brewery announced that it had purchased a taproom-adjacent property at 420 North Third Street. They plan to use the space for events and to expand their limited amount of indoor seating; although the structure was once a house, it would more than double the brewery's available indoor space. The interior of the new property opened over the 2022 New Year's weekend, and as of that time the brewery planned to open a rooftop deck in the spring.

Recognition and beer 
In 2013, Blackrocks was ranked by regional publication MLive as one of the best new breweries in the state of Michigan. In 2020 and 2021, the same outlet named their Honey Lav beer "beer of the week" and their Mykiss IPA as one of the ten best beers in Michigan. The Detroit Free Press added that Blackrocks' Mykiss IPA "might be one of the best IPAs in the state" of Michigan. In 2022, the drinks-focused publication VinePair ranked the brewery as one of the 25 best in the United States.

, 51K IPA is Blackrocks' most popular beer. When the brewery started canning in 2013, they had three mainstay beers that were regularly canned: the 51K IPA, Grand Rabbits Cream Ale, and Coconut Brown Ale. , 51K and Grand Rabbits were still being canned year-round alongside the Mykiss IPA. Seven other beers, including the Coconut Brown, were being canned seasonally.

See also 
Ore Dock Brewing Company
Keweenaw Brewing Company
Alpha Michigan Brewing Company

References

Bibliography

External links 
Official website

2010 establishments in Michigan
Companies based in Marquette, Michigan
Beer brewing companies based in the Upper Peninsula of Michigan
American companies established in 2010